The 2018 Settimana Internazionale di Coppi e Bartali was a road cycling stage race that took place between 22 and 28 March 2018. The race was rated as a 2.1 event as part of the 2018 UCI Europe Tour, and was the 33rd edition of the Settimana Internazionale di Coppi e Bartali cycling race.

Teams
Twenty-five teams started the race. Each team had a maximum of seven riders:

Route

Stages

Stage 1a

Stage 1b

Stage 2

Stage 3

Stage 4

Classifications

References

Settimana Internazionale di Coppi e Bartali
Settimana Internazionale di Coppi e Bartali
2018